School for Scoundrels is a 2006 American comedy film, starring Billy Bob Thornton and Jon Heder, and directed by Todd Phillips. The film is based on the 1960 British film School for Scoundrels. The remake was released on September 29, 2006.

The remake has a similar theme to the original film, but a noticeably different plot and tone.

Plot
Roger is a downtrodden meter reader, subject to ridicule from co-workers and regular denizens, who dreams of dating the foreign graduate student who lives in his building, Amanda. To overcome his lack of self-esteem, he signs up for a course taught by Dr. P where Roger and his classmates are constantly bullied by Dr. P and his assistant Lesher, who likes to use outrageous and unethical methods on them, including humiliation. Some tasks they are required to do are quite cruel and primitive – like the task to start a conflict or even a fight with somebody they meet just to prove they are fearless. However, nobody intends to quit the course because Dr. P says he won't give a refund of $5,000 to anyone who quits or disobeys the orders given to them. The classmates even warn Roger that Dr. P will destroy him if his progress is too fast, just like he has done to one of his former students.

While participating, Roger begins to develop a sense of personal pride and finally asks Amanda for a date where he uses tricks he learned during the course. Wanting to prove that he's still got his edge, Dr. P starts competing with Roger for Amanda. He approaches her with a false story that he is a successful and child-loving surgeon whose wife has died, and Amanda, who is a voluntary caretaker for animals, is immediately attracted and starts dating him. When Roger begins to see what's happening, he decides to take action to get Amanda back, although his actions are futile. After a competitive tennis match in which Roger humiliates him, Dr. P enlists the talents of Roger's classmates to break into Amanda's apartment and paint graffiti on the walls so he could frame Roger as a stalker. Roger uses his authority as a meter reader to impound Dr. P's car, and in retaliation Dr. P gets Roger fired from his job.

Roger learns of Dr. P's plans for Amanda, from Lonnie, a depressed former student, whose girlfriend was also led astray when he was humiliated by Dr. P. Lonnie shows Roger a fascicle full of evidence that Dr. P is a fraud, who uses multiple identities and false stories to attract or distract his victims. After learning that Dr. P invited Amanda to Miami, Roger is determined to stop him once for all. He heads for the airport where Dr. P tells him he is a winner and grants him two tickets – one for him and one for Amanda. However, Roger at first doesn't know that Dr. P has sent him to the wrong gate. After realizing he was again tricked by Dr. P, Roger heads to the right gate and boards the plane to Miami in the last moment. With the aid of Lonnie and classmates, he finally exposes Dr. P's duplicity, it's revealed that Dr. P isn't a doctor or surgeon (he wanted to use a defibrillator on Roger who just fainted, but was truly faking) and that his wife is still alive. Amanda finally realizes she was wrong and returns to Roger. When meeting Roger after some time, Dr. P grants him a diploma for passing his course – the first diploma ever issued by him. He also invites Roger to attend one of his future courses as a guest, but Roger refuses. The film closes with a summary of what happened to most characters after the film's events.

Cast

 Billy Bob Thornton as Dr. P / Dennis Sherman
 Jon Heder as Roger
 Michael Clarke Duncan as Lesher
 Jacinda Barrett as Amanda
 Sarah Silverman as Becky
 Ben Stiller as Lonnie
 David Cross as Ian
 Matt Walsh – Walsh
 Horatio Sanz as Diego
 Todd Louiso as Eli
 Jon Glaser as Ernie
 Paul Scheer as Little Pete
 Dan Fogler as Zack
 Luis Guzmán as Sergeant Moorehead
 DeRay Davis as Bee Bee
 Joanne Baron as Lois
 Andrew Daly as classmate
 Jim Parsons as classmate
 Aziz Ansari as classmate
 Joseph Nunez as classmate

Similarities between original and remake
The character of Dr. P is a homage to the headmaster of the fictional Yeovil College of Lifemanship, Stephen Potter, in the original 1960 film. The Lifemanship books, actual works on which both films are based, were written by the real author named Stephen Potter.

Both films feature a tennis game between love rivals as a set-piece.

Reception
School for Scoundrels came in at #4 at the North American box office in its opening weekend, accumulating $8,602,333, before eventually grossing $23,947,685 worldwide.

The film received mainly negative reviews, with Rotten Tomatoes giving the film 25% and a consensus that "School for Scoundrels squanders its talented cast with a formulaic, unfocused attempt at a romantic comedy that's neither romantic nor funny."

References

External links
 
 
 
 
 
 
 

2006 films
2006 romantic comedy films
American romantic comedy films
American remakes of British films
Films about con artists
Films based on British novels
Films shot in California
Films shot in Los Angeles
Films shot in New York (state)
Films scored by Christophe Beck
Films directed by Todd Phillips
Films set in New York City
Films set in schools
Dimension Films films
Metro-Goldwyn-Mayer films
The Weinstein Company films
2000s English-language films
2000s American films